Christa Merten (née Basche; 14 October 1944, Dobbertin, Germany – 1 July 1986, Marbella, Spain), was a West German athlete and Olympian who competed for West Germany in the 1960s and 70s in the 800, 1500 and 3000 meter runs and in cross country running. She committed suicide in 1986.

On July 31, 1971, she set a world record in Lübeck with Ellen Tittel, Sylvia Schenk, and Hildegard Falck in the 800 meter relay. Merten started the 1500 meter run at the 1972 Summer Olympics and the 800 meter run at the 1971 European Athletics Championships, but failed to reach the finals. At the 1972 European Athletics Indoor Championships, she earned fourth place at the 800 meter dash.

A German Championship of the Federal Republic, she won with the 3 × 800 m season of VfL Wolfsburg, 1970 in the short cross-country race, 1965, 1966 and 1970 with the cross-country team and 1973 in the 3000 meter run (9:23.0 min). From 1970 to 1973, she broke four German records of the Federal Republic in the 1000, 1500 and 3000 meter run.

Merten was 1.68 m tall and weighed 54 kg in her time as an active athlete. Until 1964, she belonged to the sports club SC Charlottenburg, then VfL Wolfsburg, then ASV Köln and finally from 1971 onward, Bayer 04 Leverkusen.

References

Further reading
 Klaus Amrhein: Biographisches Handbuch zur Geschichte der Deutschen Leichtathletik 1898–2005. 2 Bände. Darmstadt 2005 (publiziert über Deutsche Leichtathletik Promotion- und Projektgesellschaft)

1944 births
1986 suicides
People from Ludwigslust-Parchim
People from Mecklenburg
West German female long-distance runners
Sportspeople from Mecklenburg-Western Pomerania
Olympic athletes of West Germany
Athletes (track and field) at the 1972 Summer Olympics
German national athletics champions
Suicides in Spain
Female suicides